Colgú mac Faílbe Flaind (died 678)  was a King of Munster from the Eóganacht Chaisil branch of the Eoganachta. He was the son of Faílbe Flann mac Áedo Duib (d.639), a previous king. He succeeded Cathal Cú-cen-máthair mac Cathail as king in 665. The annals mention no details of his reign. His known son was named Nad Froích.

He is also a prominent character in the Sister Fidelma mystery series written by Peter Tremayne.

Notes

See also
Kings of Munster

References

Annals of Tigernach
Francis John Byrne, Irish Kings and High-Kings 
The Chronology of the Irish Annals, Daniel P. McCarthy

External links
CELT: Corpus of Electronic Texts at University College Cork

Kings of Munster
678 deaths
7th-century Irish monarchs
Year of birth unknown